Béla Nagy (born 9 May 1941) is a Hungarian former sports shooter. He competed in the 300 m rifle, three positions event at the 1972 Summer Olympics.

References

1941 births
Living people
Hungarian male sport shooters
Olympic shooters of Hungary
Shooters at the 1972 Summer Olympics
Sport shooters from Budapest